Vera Vladimirovna Shimanskaya (born 10 April 1981) is a Russian rhythmic gymnast. She won a gold medal at the 2000 Summer Olympics.

References

External links
 Profile  on sports-reference.com

1981 births
Living people
Russian rhythmic gymnasts
Olympic gymnasts of Russia
Olympic gold medalists for Russia
Gymnasts at the 2000 Summer Olympics
Gymnasts from Moscow
Olympic medalists in gymnastics
Medalists at the 2000 Summer Olympics